Steve Forde is an Australian country music artist and host of Rollin with... on the Country Music Channel.

Biography

Early years
Steve Forde was born in the regional farming centre of Cowra, New South Wales in 1977. Steve spent most of his early childhood moving from town to town across NSW with his family. He is a singer, a songwriter and a touring country star. Although retired now, Steve was a successful bull rider and bareback bronc rider.

At 18 years old, Ford joined his first band and tasted the life of a touring country musician. It was also during this time that Forde decided that he wanted to join the rodeo as a bull rider.

He first left for the United States in 1998 he joined a country band in Texas and toured through Colorado, South Dakota and into Canada. When the gigs were lean he would often be working in bars, building fences or riding bareback broncos in Lubbock, Texas.

Steve headed back to Australia when he heard that his father needed help on the farm and he went to work on the farm, still doing rodeos during the weekends. He bought his farm, near Grenfell, New South Wales and set about getting it cleaned up, stocked up and productive while still helping his father on his farm and finding time to getaway riding broncos.

2000-present: Recording years
In 2000, Steve started his band The Flange whose debut album Livin' Right was released in May 2002. At the 2003 Country Music Awards of Australia, the band were nominated for two awards. The single "What I’m talking about" spending twenty-six weeks in the CMC top twenty.

The group's second albu, Wild Ride was  recorded in Nashville in December 2003 and released in 2004.

Discography

Albums

Awards and nominations

APRA Awards
The APRA Awards are presented annually from 1982 by the Australasian Performing Right Association (APRA), "honouring composers and songwriters". They commenced in 1982.

! 
|-
| 2010 
| "I Ain't That Guy"
| Country Work of the Year
| 
| 
|-

Country Music Awards of Australia
The Country Music Awards of Australia (CMAA) (also known as the Golden Guitar Awards) is an annual awards night held in January during the Tamworth Country Music Festival, celebrating recording excellence in the Australian country music industry. They have been held annually since 1973.
 (wins only)
|-
|rowspan="3"| 2008
|rowspan="3"| "Spirit of the Bush" (with Lee Kernaghan & Adam Brand)
| Vocal Collaboration of the Year
| 
|-
| Video Clip of the Year
| 
|-
| Single of the Year
|

References

External links
 Steve Forde Home Page
Ben Sorensen's REAL Country radio interview with Steve Forde on Hurricane - August 2010

Australian country singers
Australian male singers
Living people
People from Cowra
R&J Records artists
Year of birth missing (living people)